Zespół Szkół Ogólnokształcących nr 10 – public school consisting of I Liceum Ogólnokształcące im. Edwarda Dembowskiego (high school) and Gimnazjum nr 14 (middle school), located on Zimnej Wody street in Gliwice, Poland.

The School Building 

The beginning of 20th century was a time of rapid development for the city of Gliwice. A growing number of inhabitants created a need for establishing a new educational institution that would admit students from other school in Gliwice which experienced and excessive number of pupils. The construction work began on 11 August 1913 and was based on the project of Wilhelm Kranz. However, the works had to be suspended due to flooding of Kłodnica river. In fact, great efforts made to protect the foundations of the building allowed it to be finished in 1915 as previously planned. The total cost amounted to 400 000 marks (about $290 000).
After the Second World War, in 1949 755 students commenced there their education in the primary and high school, and since 1976 
I Liceum Ogólnokształcące was founded on 1 September 1949 and along with a primary school provided education for 755 students. Since 1976 I LO functioned individually until 2001 when the authorities of Gliwice decided to connect it with Gimnazjum nr 14, which now together form ZSO nr 10.

Tuition 

ZSO nr 10 is one of few schools in Poland which put an emphasis on international-orientated education in International Baccalaureate Programme:
 since 2008 Gimnazjum nr 14 provides bilingual tutoring, with English as the leading language; there are plans for introducing International Baccalaureate Middle Years Programme in September 2014
 in 2010 I LO was authorised by International Baccalaureate Organisation and allows students to enter International Baccalaureate Diploma Programme
The school also educates students following Polish curriculum and offers tuition with specialisation in various fields (with a focus on mathematics and physics, mathematics and geography, law and economics, and medicine).

References 

 

Schools in Poland